The 1968 Havering Council election took place on 9 May 1968 to elect members of Havering London Borough Council in London, England. The whole council was up for election and the Conservative party gained overall control of the council.

Election result

Ward results

References

1968
1968 London Borough council elections